Michele Malfatti (born 31 December 1994) is an Italian speed skater. He competed in the men's 5000 metres and the 10 000 m at the 2022 Winter Olympics.

References

External links
 

1994 births
Living people
Italian male speed skaters
Olympic speed skaters of Italy
Speed skaters at the 2022 Winter Olympics
Sportspeople from Trento